The Burnett Honors College is an academic college of the University of Central Florida located in Orlando, Florida, United States. Founded in 1998 as the University Honors Program, it was expanded and renamed in 2002 in response to a $1.5 million gift by Al and Nancy Burnett. The dean of the college is Sheila Amin Gutiérrez de Piñeres, Ph.D.

The college administers UCF's two honors programs, University Honors and Honors Undergraduate Thesis, through programs of advanced study at the university's main campus in Orlando. These programs encompass students who are also in one of UCF's twelve other academic colleges, but have applied to and been accepted to the Burnett Honors College. The college offers an honors dormitory in the Towers at Knights Plaza, and honors students are assisted with applying for prestigious post-graduate honors and fellowships, Other benefits include priority scheduling, specialized academic advisers, smaller classes that benefit from a more hands-on approach, and specialty courses and programs.

History
In 1998, the UCF Honors Program was granted college status. Al and Nancy Burnett donated $1.5 million towards the completion of a building to house the new honors college, and it was subsequently named in their honor. A state grant matched the donation made by the Burnett's, bringing total funding for the new college to $3 million. Ground was broken on the new facility on April 24, 2001, and the Burnett Honors College building was completed in May 2002, and formally dedicated on October 23, 2002.

In 2007 the college partnered with the Department of Housing and Residence Life to create a living-learning community, composed mostly of honors students, in Tower III at Knights Plaza.

Admission
Admission to the Burnett Honors College is strictly limited to incoming freshmen for the University Honors program, and juniors and seniors for the Honors in the Major program. Requirements for freshman entrance include excellent high school grades, one essay, strong extracurricular activities, and teacher references. The Honors in the Major program requires a minimum of 60 completed credit hours, a 3.2 GPA, and the recommendation of a tenured professor in the student's major.

A recent Burnett Honors College incoming class had an average SAT score of 1457, an average ACT score of 32.1 and average high school GPAs of 4.46 (weighted). The class boasted 27 National Merit Scholars, 115 AP Scholars and eight National Hispanic Scholars.

Academics
The mission of the college is to provide a challenging academic program and a foundation for future achievement to UCF's most academically talented undergraduate students. With only 1,700 students in the college, the Burnett Honors College combines the intimacy of a small liberal arts college with the advantages of a large metropolitan research university. The college does not have any departments or offer any degrees by itself; all of its students are also students of one of the other colleges at the university. Burnett students benefit from being able to take smaller honors-versions of both lower-division and upper-division university courses (most of which are limited to a 20-student capacity), priority multiple-term class registration, usage of a private BHC Computer Lab, Reading Room, extended library privileges, scholarship opportunities, among others.

Programs
The Burnett Honors College offers two distinct Honors programs for students: University Honors, which is a 4-year program in which students must apply as high school seniors, and Honors in the Major, which allows juniors and seniors to conduct original research within their major and write an undergraduate honors thesis. University Honors students must maintain a 3.2 overall GPA, and a 3.0 honors GPA.

The two programs are not mutually exclusive, and in fact share many common elements. If a student completes one of these programs, an Honors distinction corresponding to the program that was completed will appear on the student's diploma and official transcript. The college also offers many events and programs, which are open to UCF students regardless of whether or not they are honors students. In addition, the honors college houses the Office of Prestigious Awards, which provides information and preparation services for all UCF students interested in applying for prestigious scholarships and fellowships.

References

External links
Burnett Honors College
University of Central Florida Official Website

Burnett Honors College
Public honors colleges
Educational institutions established in 1998
1998 establishments in Florida